The R192 road is a regional road in Ireland, linking Cootehill to Shercock in County Cavan.

Route 
North to south the route starts at the R190 outside Cootehill. It heads southeast for 17km to its junction with the R181 just outside Shercock, along its route it passes Lough Tacker and Lough Sillan, Cohaw a Neolithic court tomb and crosses the River Annalee.

See also 
 Roads in Ireland
 National primary road
 National secondary road

References 
 Roads Act 1993 (Classification of Regional Roads) Order 2006 – Department of Transport

Regional roads in the Republic of Ireland
Roads in County Cavan